Johnny Paycheck (born Donald Eugene Lytle; May 31, 1938 – February 19, 2003) was an American country music singer and Grand Ole Opry member notable for recording the David Allan Coe song "Take This Job and Shove It". He achieved his greatest success in the 1970s as a force in country music's "outlaw movement" popularized by artists Hank Williams Jr., Waylon Jennings, Willie Nelson, Billy Joe Shaver, and Merle Haggard. In 1980, Paycheck appeared on the PBS music program Austin City Limits (season 5). But during that decade, his music career slowed due to drug, alcohol, and legal problems. He served a prison sentence in the early 1990s and his declining health effectively ended his career in early 2000. In autographs, Paycheck signed his name "PayCheck".

Early life 
Johnny Paycheck was born Donald Eugene Lytle on May 31, 1938, in Greenfield, Ohio. By age 9, Lytle was already playing in talent contests. He was singing professionally by age 15.

Career 
After a stint in the Navy in the 1950s, he relocated to Nashville, Tennessee. He was a tenor harmony singer with numerous hard country performers in the late 1950s and early 1960s, including Ray Price. He worked along with Willie Nelson in Price's band the Cherokee Cowboys. He was featured as a tenor singer on recordings by Faron Young, Roger Miller, and Skeets McDonald.  In 1960, he reached Top 35 status in Cashbox magazine's country charts as Donny Young with the tune "Miracle Of Love". In the early 1960s, he convinced country music legend George Jones to hire him. Paycheck provided harmony vocals as well as bass and steel guitar for Jones. He later co-wrote Jones's hit song "Once You've Had the Best." From the early to mid 1960s, he also enjoyed some success as a songwriter for others, with his biggest songwriting hit being "Apartment No. 9", which served as Tammy Wynette's first chart hit in December 1966. 

In 1964, he changed his name legally to Johnny Paycheck, taking the name from Johnny Paychek, a top-ranked boxer from Chicago who once fought Joe Louis for the heavyweight title (and not directly as a humorous alternative to Johnny Cash, as is commonly believed). He first charted under his new name with "A-11" in 1965. His bestselling single from this period was "She's All I Got", which reached No. 2 on the US country singles charts in 1971 and made it onto the Billboard Hot 100. His "Mr. Lovemaker" also reached No. 2 on the US country singles chart in 1973. But with the popularity of Willie Nelson and Waylon Jennings in the mid-1970s, Paycheck changed his image to that of outlaw, with which he was to have his largest financial success. 

His producer Billy Sherrill helped revive his career by significantly changing his sound and image. Sherrill was best known for carefully choreographing his records and infusing them with considerable pop feel. The Paycheck records were clearly based on Sherrill's take on the bands backing Waylon Jennings and Willie Nelson on records.

A member of the Grand Ole Opry, Paycheck is best remembered for his 1977 hit single, "Take This Job and Shove It", written by David Allan Coe, which sold over two million copies and inspired a motion picture of the same name. "Colorado Kool-Aid", "Me and the IRS", "Friend, Lover, Wife", "Slide Off of Your Satin Sheets", and "I'm the Only Hell (Mama Ever Raised)" were other hits for Paycheck during this period. He received an Academy of Country Music Career Achievement award in 1977.

The most successful of his later singles, released during his appeal, was "Old Violin", which reached No.  21 on the country chart in 1986. His last album to chart was "Modern Times" in 1987. He continued to release albums, the last of which, Remembering, appeared in 2002. He continued to perform and tour until the late 1990s. Shortly before his retirement, in 1997, he was inducted into the Grand Ole Opry; in a rare exception to protocol, Opry general manager Bob Whittaker personally invited Paycheck to join instead of having another member do the invitation.

Record companies 
With his producer, Aubrey Mayhew, Paycheck co-owned his record company, Little Darlin' Records. Paycheck's recordings by Little Darlin' featured the pedal steel guitar work of Lloyd Green. By the end of the 1960s, Little Darlin' Records folded. Mayhew and Paycheck soon created Certron Records, a newly formed recording company owned by Certron (a manufacturer of audio and video tape). The label was able to sign Bobby Helms, Ronnie Dove, Clint Eastwood, Pozo-Seco Singers (as Pozo Seco), and Paycheck. After the move to Certron, the label was unable to make a profit and closed by 1972. In the late 1990s, after decades ignored, Little Darlin' recordings received recognition by country music historians for their distinctive and sharp-edged sound, considered unique in their time—Paycheck's in particular.

Personal life 
Paycheck was married; he and his wife Sharon had a son. In the 1990s, he began capitalizing the 'c' in his surname to PayCheck.

Legal troubles 

In the 1950s, he was court-martialed and imprisoned for two years for assaulting a naval officer.

In 1981, Paycheck was arrested for statutory rape of a 12-year-old girl in Wyoming. Members of Paycheck's band told police that the singer had numerous problems with allegations because of his celebrity status. He was released on bond. In 1982, he pleaded no contest in order to continue his touring and not go to trial. The prosecution's witnesses were reluctant to testify. He pleaded down to a misdemeanor and received a $1,000 fine. A $3 million civil suit resulted from the incident, but the case never made it to a court.

In December 1985, Paycheck was convicted and sentenced to seven years in jail for shooting a man at the North High Lounge in Hillsboro, Ohio; he had fired a .22 pistol, and the bullet grazed the man's head. Paycheck claimed the act was self-defense. After several years spent fighting the sentence, he began serving his sentence in 1989, spending 22 months in prison before being pardoned by Ohio Governor Richard Celeste.

In 1990, he filed for bankruptcy after tax problems with the Internal Revenue Service (IRS) such as a $300,000 lien.

Health issues and demise 
Although Paycheck was addicted to drugs and alcohol during his career, he later was said to have "put his life in order" after his prison stay.

After 2000, his health would only allow for short appearances. Contracting emphysema and asthma after a lengthy illness, Paycheck died at Nashville's Vanderbilt University Medical Center in 2003, aged 64. He was survived by a son and two daughters.

He was buried in Woodlawn Memorial Park Cemetery in Nashville, in a plot donated by George Jones.

Legacy 
A tribute album, Touch My Heart: a Tribute to Johnny Paycheck, was released in 2004 on the Sugar Hill Label. Produced by Robbie Fulks, the album features George Jones, Marshall Crenshaw, Hank Williams III, Al Anderson, Dallas Wayne, Neko Case, Gail Davies and Fulks himself covering some of Paycheck's best-known songs.
In his song "Grand Ole Opry (Ain't So Grand Anymore)", Hank Williams III praises Paycheck (along with Waylon Jennings, Johnny Cash, and Hank Williams Jr.) as a "real rebel" the Grand Ole Opry only reluctantly inducted. 

His song "It Won't Be Long (And I'll Be Hating You)" appears in the open-world action-adventure video game Grand Theft Auto V.

His song "(Pardon Me) I've Got Someone to Kill" is covered on the album All the Way by Diamanda Galás.

Discography

References

External links 
 
 

1938 births
2003 deaths
American country singer-songwriters
Deaths from asthma
Deaths from emphysema
Epic Records artists
Mercury Records artists
Outlaw country singers
Grand Ole Opry members
Singer-songwriters from Ohio
People from Greenfield, Ohio
American people convicted of assault
Recipients of American gubernatorial pardons
20th-century American singers
Country musicians from Ohio
Prisoners and detainees of Ohio